Chariesthes somaliensis is a species of beetle in the family Cerambycidae. It was described by Stephan von Breuning in 1934. It is known from Tanzania, Somalia and Kenya.

References

Chariesthes
Beetles described in 1934